Jonah Pezet (born 17 January 2003) is an Australian rugby league footballer who plays as a  or  for the Melbourne Storm in the National Rugby League (NRL).

Early life
Pezet was born in Gosford, New South Wales and is the son of former South Queensland Crushers and Parramatta Eels player Troy Pezet.

He played junior rugby league for the Valentine-Eleebana Devils and the Wyong Roos.

Playing career

Early career
From 2018 through the end of the 2020 season, Pezet was a member of the Newcastle Knights junior representative teams, progressing from the Harold Matthews Cup to the S. G. Ball Cup in 2020. He would move to the Melbourne Storm in 2021, playing for the Victoria Thunderbolts in the Jersey Flegg Cup, as well as the Brisbane Tigers in the Hastings Deering Colts competition. Pezet was selected to represent New South Wales in the Under 19's State of Origin match against Queensland in June 2022, and was awarded player of the match honours with four try assists.

Pezet would play 10 matches for Melbourne Storm affiliate club Brisbane Tigers during the 2022 Queensland Cup season. In December 2022, Pezet re-signed with Melbourne until the end of the 2025 NRL season.

Melbourne Storm
In round 3 of the 2023 NRL season, Pezet made his debut for Melbourne against Gold Coast Titans. He had his Melbourne jersey (cap number 229) presented to him by his father Troy.

References

External links
Melbourne Storm profile
Rugby League Project profile
QRL profile
18th Man profile

2003 births
Living people
Australian rugby league players
Melbourne Storm players
Eastern Suburbs Tigers players